The 1914 Syracuse Orangemen football team represented Syracuse University during the 1914 NCAA football season. The head coach was Frank "Buck" O'Neill, coaching his fourth season with the Orangemen. The team played their home games at Archbold Stadium in Syracuse, New York.

Schedule

References

Syracuse
Syracuse Orange football seasons
Syracuse Orangemen football